Events in the year 1774 in Norway.

Incumbents
Monarch: Christian VII

Events
11 October - Det nyttige Selskab, a non-profit organization, was founded in Bergen.

Arts and literature

Births
25 May - Isaach Isaachsen, politician (died 1828)
2 August - Ole Clausen Mørch, politician (died 1829)
8 October - Teis Lundegaard, farmer, shipowner, politician and representative at the Norwegian Constituent Assembly (died 1856)

Deaths
25 February – Knud Leem, linguist (born 1697).
11 August – Frederik Nannestad, bishop (born 1693)

See also

References